The Devki Group of Companies, commonly referred to as the Devki Group, is a privately owned conglomerate in Kenya. Narendra Raval, a wealthy Kenyan industrialist and philanthropist is a majority shareholder in each of the companies in the Group. The majority of the companies in the group focus on the manufacturing of building materials, including cement, aluminum and steel. The group has subsidiaries in Kenya, Uganda and the Democratic Republic of the Congo.

Location
The factories of the subsidiary companies are located in various Kenyan locations and in two other regional countries.

Overview
As of April 2021, Devki Group is mainly involved in the manufacture of building materials, including steel, aluminum and cement. At that time, the group was the largest manufacturer of cement and steel in Kenya.

The Group's founder and executive chairman, is the majority shareholder in the companies that comprise the group. In April 2021 Business Daily Africa estimated his net worth at over  US$500 million. At that time the conglomerate manufactured products worth over US$650 million annually and employed more than 6,500 workers.

History
Narendra Raval came to Kenya in 1982, poor and single. In 1986, newly married, he and his wife, Neeta, started a hardware store in the Gikomba Market in Nairobi. Business grew and several years later, with the help of a bank loan of US$70,000, they were able to establish their first steel mill.

Subsidiary companies
As of April 2021, the companies of the Devki Group included but were not limited to the following:

1. Devki Steel Mills Limited: Ruiru, Kenya

2. Maisha Mabati Mills Limited: Ruiru, Kenya

3. National Cement Company Limited: Athi River, Kenya.

4. Maisha Packaging Company Limited : Athi River, Kenya

5. Northwood Aviation Limited: Nairobi, Kenya.

6. Simba Cement Uganda Limited: Tororo, Uganda. 

7. ARM Cement Limited: Athi River, Kenya.

See also

 List of conglomerates in Kenya
 List of conglomerates in Africa
 List of wealthiest people in Kenya

References

External links
 Devki Group Homepage

 
Manufacturing companies established in 1986
Conglomerate companies of Kenya
Kiambu County
1986 establishments in Kenya